Nupe or NUPE may refer to:
Nupe people, of Nigeria
Nupe language, their language
The Bida Emirate, also known as the Nupe Kingdom, their former state
A member of the Kappa Alpha Psi fraternity in the United States
National Union of Public Employees (New Zealand), a trade union in New Zealand
National Union of Public Employees, a former trade union in the United Kingdom

Language and nationality disambiguation pages